The World Repair Video Game (2015) is a novel by Australian author David Ireland.

The novel was serialised in five parts then published as a limited edition hardback by Island magazine and has been shortlisted in the Fiction Category of the 2016 Prime Minister's Literary Awards.

Plot 
This novel is about 42-year-old Kennard Stirling, son of a wealthy family, who has spurned his inheritance in favour of a small town, rural New South Wales coast, where he spends his days helping the elderly and needy members of the community, while in his spare time working on his own hobby: a project to rejuvenate various bush blocks, but fertilised by the murdered remains of itinerants, drifters and economic losers that Stirling has judged not to offer anything to society.
 
The World Repair Video Game enters the articulate, philosophical, but ultimately unsettling reflections of Kennard Sterling, as he holds modern Australian culture to our gaze.

Critical reception 
The Australian'''s chief literary critic, Geordie Williamson wrote: "In The World Repair Video Game, Ireland has written an impossible novel: one shriven entirely of the social. Yet in doing so he has revealed the illogic that underlies what we call economic rationalism. He has drawn our coming world in a clear and terrible light."

Nicolas Rothwell wrote in The Australian that The World Repair Video Game'' is "a precise, controlled exercise in horror writing and cryptic social commentary, elegantly written, unremittingly dark. The tale is simply done: we travel in the mind of a monologue-spinning, self-justifying serial killer, a man on a mission to cleanse the fallen world. As always when murder is in the air, the narrative has a disquieting drive, modulated by the serene clarity of Ireland’s prose."

References 

Novels by David Ireland
2015 Australian novels
Novels set in New South Wales